Danny Latza (born 7 December 1989) is a German footballer who plays as a midfielder for and captains Bundesliga club Schalke 04.

Career
Latza began his footballing career in 1995, at the age of five, as a youth player with his local team, DJK Arminia Ückendorf. He stayed as a player for three years before moving to Schalke 04 where he started his professional career. Latza's first professional appearance was in the Bundesliga on 14 February 2009 against VfL Bochum, when he came on as a substitute for Levan Kobiashvili.

Latza joined the SV Darmstadt 98 for the 2011–12 3. Liga season. On 22 May 2013, it was announced that the MSV Duisburg had signed Latza. However this contract was valid only for the 2. Bundesliga and was voided when the Deutsche Fußball Liga denied Duisburg the license to play in the 2013–14 2. Bundesliga season. After a brief trial spell, Latza signed with the 2. Bundesliga side Bochum.

On 17 December 2016, Latza scored his first Bundesliga goals, a hat-trick for 1. FSV Mainz 05, in a 3–1 home victory against Hamburger SV.

On 17 March 2021, Latza agreed to rejoin Schalke 04 on a free transfer for the 2021–22 season, signing a two-year contract which will be extended by an extra year should Schalke achieve promotion in that time. He was promptly appointed the team's captain under the head coach Dimitrios Grammozis.

Career statistics

Honours
Schalke 04
2. Bundesliga: 2021–22

References

External links

Profile at the FC Schalke 04 website
 

1989 births
Living people
FC Schalke 04 II players
FC Schalke 04 players
SV Darmstadt 98 players
VfL Bochum players
Bundesliga players
2. Bundesliga players
3. Liga players
Regionalliga players
Oberliga (football) players
Association football midfielders
German footballers
Germany youth international footballers
People educated at the Gesamtschule Berger Feld
Sportspeople from Gelsenkirchen
Footballers from North Rhine-Westphalia